Asura zebrina is a moth of the family Erebidae first described by George Hampson in 1914. It is found in New South Wales, Australia.

References

zebrina
Moths described in 1914
Moths of Australia